The Bambatha Rifles (formerly the Witwatersrand Rifles) is a reserve mechanised infantry regiment of the South African Army.

History

Origin
The Witwatersrand Rifles (often familiarly known as the "Wits Rifles or the Wit Rifles") was formed by proclamation on 1 May 1903 and absorbed the members of the Railway Pioneer Regiment and the Rand Rifles, both of which had fought on the British side during the Second Anglo-Boer War of 1899 – 1902.

As befitted a regiment based from the gold-rich Witwatersrand region, it had a very close relationship with the mining establishment of the time; and its cap badge further emphasised this link.

Bambatha Rebellion
The regiment first saw action during the Bambata Rebellion of 1906, when it deployed a contingent to (the then) Zululand.

Absorption of the Transvaal Light Infantry

In 1907 the regiment was further strengthened when it absorbed the Transvaal Light Infantry Regiment.

World War 1
The regiment was mobilised again when World War I broke out.

German South West Africa
The first action that it took part in was the South African invasion of German South-West Africa (now Namibia).

After the successful conclusion of this campaign, virtually all members volunteered for overseas service.

Western Front
Most of the volunteers were consequently assigned to the 3rd South African Infantry Battalion. (Due to the South African military law of the time, soldiers could not be forced to serve overseas, nor could existing military units be deployed there.) The most well-known action that this unit took part in was the Battle of Delville Wood in the Somme.

East Africa
Other members of the regiment served in the Witwatersrand Rifles company of 7th Infantry ACF, which served in German East Africa against the forces of General von Lettow-Vorbeck.

Rand Revolt
The inter-war years saw the regiment deployed during the 1922 Rand Revolt, when rebellious South African Communist Party miners attempted to overthrow the government of General Jan Smuts.

In the early 1930s the regiment affiliated with the Cameronians (Scottish Rifles) Regiment of the British Army. As a consequence, the Witwatersrand Rifles adopted the uniform and many of the traditions of this Scottish Lowland regiment. Despite the Cameronians' disbandment in 1968, the Wits Rifles still continues this heritage today.

World War 2
As a result of the outbreak of World War II in 1939, the regiment was expanded to two battalions. However, due to the battalions being used to supply replacements in a piecemeal fashion to depleted South African units taking part in the North African campaign, the Witwatersrand Rifles was only deployed as a coherent unit (to Egypt) in 1943.

During its service in North Africa, the Witwatersrand Rifles was amalgamated with Regiment de la Rey. This combined regiment, was nicknamed the "Royal Boere" and saw extensive action in Italy as part of the South African 6th Armoured Division, particularly at Monte Caprara and Monte Stanco.

Border War
From 1970 until the first all-race democratic elections in 1994, the regiment saw action in the South African Border War in South-West Africa (now Namibia) and Angola as well as on the South Africa/Botswana border and in South African townships.

Post 1994
When conscription ended in 1993, the regiment began an active recruitment drive to maintain reserve troop strength.
During South Africa's second democratic election in 1999, the regiment deployed 180 volunteers in support of the South African Police Service (SAPS).

Late in its history the Witwatersrand Rifles Regiment attracted volunteers for regular part-time training.

Scottish tradition
To maintain its Scottish links, the regiment had formed alliances with the Cameronians (Scottish Rifles) and the King's Own Scottish Borderers (now amalgamated into the Royal Scots Borderers). Up to the disbandment and name change, members of the regiment continued to maintain their traditional Scottish Lowland uniforms and traditions and uphold very high standards of discipline and effective military training.

The regiment also had an active pipe band as well as one of the top shooting teams in the country and was ably supported by a Regimental Council, a very active Regimental Association and a Ladies Committee up to the point of the renaming process.

Peacekeeping
The Witwatersrand Rifles Regiment provided troops for internal operations in support of the South African Police Service and on the border (as part of Operation Corona) as well as for United Nations peacekeeping operations in the DRC and the Sudan.

Name Change
In August 2019, 52 Reserve Force units had their names changed to reflect the diverse military history of South Africa. The Witwatersrand Rifles became the Bambatha Rifles, and have 3 years to design and implement new regimental insignia.

Freedom of Entry
The Regiment holds the Freedom of the Cities of Johannesburg and Germiston as well as the town of Barberton.

Commanding officers

Colonel-in-Chief 
(This Honorary post officially fell away in 1961 when the Union of South Africa became a Republic)
HM Queen Elizabeth (The Queen Mother) (1947–1961) (unofficially 1947 – 2002)

Railway Pioneer Regiment
Lt Col.J.E. Capper, RE (1899–1903) (Later Maj Gen. J.E. Capper)

Witwatersand Rifles

1st Battalion

2nd Battalion

Regimental Symbols
Regimental motto: "Pro Deo et Patria" (For God and Country). This motto was adopted in 1961, when the Republic of South Africa became a republic, prior to 1961 the motto was "Pro Deo et Rege et Patria" (For God, King and Country).
Regimental march: "Within a Mile O' Edinburgh Town".
Regimental anniversaries: Regimental Day (1 May), Monte Stanco Day (20 April). 
Regimental Freedoms: Germiston, Johannesburg, Barberton.
Regimental badge: A Maltese cross within a wreath of ten Protea flowers, with a rifle on each side of the cross. The cross was surmounted by a stringed bugle and in the centre of the cross is a mine shaft in a circlet. At the top of the wreath is the Cameronian Star and on the base of the wreath is a scroll with the inscription "Pro Deo et Patria".
Regimental headdress: Glengarry or Kilmarnoch with black hackle.
Regimental tartan: Douglas (trews).

Previous Dress Insignia

Current Dress Insignia

Honours and Affiliations

Battle honours
As a Rifle regiment, the Witwatersrand Rifles did not carry colours. Instead the honours banner was displayed on the pipes of the Pipe Major. The Witwatersrand Rifles had the following battle honours:
First World War:
South West Africa 1914–1915 
Second World War:
Italy 1944–45, Cassino II, Allerona, Florence, Monte Querciabella, Monte Fili, The Greve, Gothic Line, Monte Stanco, Monte Salvaro, Sole/Caprara, Po Valley, Campo Santo Bridge

Sister Regiments
 – Transvaal Scottish Regiment
 – Regiment de la Rey

Alliances
 – The Royal Scots Borderers
 – Cameronians (Scottish Rifles)

References

External links
Witwatersrand Rifles Regimental History Archive

South African Army
Infantry regiments of South Africa
Military units and formations in Germiston
Military units and formations established in 1903
Military units and formations of South Africa in World War I
Military units and formations of South Africa in World War II
Military units and formations of South Africa in the Border War